Natural observation may refer to:
 observational study
 Naturalistic observation
 self-observation